Javier Cárcamo (born January 25, 1980) is a Guatemalan novelist, visual artist and author, alongside the muralist Jorge Corleto and other artists, the murals that illustrate the history of art, in the walls of the Popular University of Guatemala, declared as Cultural Heritage of Guatemala, by the Instituto de Antropología e Historia (Institute of Anthropology and History).

Biography
Javier Cárcamo was born in Guatemala, Guatemala, on January 25, 1980. 
He was born in the suburbs of Guatemala City and studied in the Roberto Cabrera night school of plastic arts, of the Popular University of Guatemala. Cárcamo worked alongside artists such as the muralist Jorge Corleto, the painter Francisco Escobedo and the sculptor Byron Ramírez.

Other of his collections were "Stigio '99", "The Tunnel of the Massacres", "Reliving the Scene of the Crime", "After Hours of Thought" and "Gods You Are", a collection of  engravings created with blood.
He was a teacher at the Escuela Nacional de Artes Plásticas "Rafael Rodríguez Padilla" (National School of Plastic Arts) (ENAP) and his collection Art is Not Explained was presentd to commemorate the centenary of the school.

As a novelist, he has published  "Words that you would never dedicate" (Palabras que Nunca Dedicarías), in the year 2003, "What I Wrote While You Were Hiding" (Lo que escribí mientras te escondías), (2008) and "The Apotheosis of the Stones" (2019), a psychological and gothic novel.

Visual arts exhibitions
 Homage Max Saravia Gual 1996
 Stigio'99 1999
 The Tunnel of the Massacres 1999
 Reliving the Scene of the Crime 1999
 Homage Centenary of César Brañas 1999
 After Hours of Thought 2000
 Gods You Are 2001
 ENAP Art exhibit of teachers 2015
 The stray dogs 2017
 Art is Not Explained 2020

Literature
 Words that you would never dedicate A Novel (2003, Lidet; ISBN 978-99939-0-734-3 )
 What I Wrote While You Were Hiding A Novel (2008, Lidet; ISBN 978-99939-0-733-6 )
 Genesis Empresarial Foundation 30th Anniversary (2018, Genesis Empresarial Foundation; ISBN 
 The Apotheosis of the Stones: A Novel (2019, Lidet; ISBN 978-9929-787-44-5 )

References 

1980 births
Living people
Guatemalan novelists
21st-century Guatemalan male artists
Guatemalan painters
Guatemalan male poets
Universidad de San Carlos de Guatemala alumni